= Wacki: Kosmiczna Rozgrywka =

1998 video game

- Developer: Seven Stars Multimedia
- Publisher: Seven Stars Multimedia
- Platform: Microsoft Windows
- Release: WW: July 1, 1998
- Genre: Adventure video game
- Mode: Single-player

Wacki: Kosmiczna Rozgrywka is an adventure game by Seven Stars Multimedia released on July 1, 1998 for Windows.

== Plot and gameplay ==
Franz Josef and Edek Baryła, two Polish teenagers, have to help Aargh the alien gather pieces of A.C.M.E to stop a meteorite from destroying his home, because if his planet is gone, Earth will soon fall to the same fate.

The game has the generic gaming interface of a hand-drawn adventure title. It contains colourful cartoon, graphics and specific humor to Polish culture.

The game contains various easter eggs that were only discovered decades after the game's release.

== Production ==
In 1996, CD Projekt signed an exclusive distribution agreement with Seven Stars, which included this game upon its release.

== Critical reception ==
GamePressure and Gry Online gave it 8.6. Ekspert deemed it the perfect title for native Polish adventure gamers. Games Guru felt it was part of the group of cult games that held a special place in the hearts of older Polish gamers. Onet Technologie noted that while the game was humorous it is quite hard. Benchmark felt that the artistic achievements of Seven Stars ended with this title. Adventure Zone thought the game would appeal to lovers of titles like Day of the Tentacle. InnPoland felt the title didn't have innovative graphics or interface.
